Rakestraw House is a historic home located near Garrett in Keyser Township, DeKalb County, Indiana.  It was built about 1915, and is a -story, Bungalow / American Craftsman style frame dwelling.  It has a low pitched gable roof and large shed roofed dormer.

It was added to the National Register of Historic Places in 1983.

References

Houses on the National Register of Historic Places in Indiana
Houses completed in 1915
Houses in DeKalb County, Indiana
National Register of Historic Places in DeKalb County, Indiana